Slovakia competed at the 2015 World Championships in Athletics in Beijing, China, from 22–30 August 2015.

Medalists 
The following competitors from Slovakia won medals at the Championships

Results
(q – qualified, NM – no mark, SB – season best)

Men
Track and road events

Field events

Women 
Track and road events

Field events

Sources 
Slovak team

Nations at the 2015 World Championships in Athletics
World Championships in Athletics
Slovakia at the World Championships in Athletics